Su Nombre Es Joaquin (in English: His name is Joaquin) is a 2011 Chilean soap opera produced and broadcast by TVN.

Plot 
Valle Azul (Blue Valley) is northern Chilean town bringing clear skies and is a place that arriving in that madhouse called La Comunidad (The Community) led by Joaquin Arellano (Alvaro Rudolphy), who has three wives Lola, Julia, Carolina and other youths, whom also live with calm, meditations and spiritual preparation for the end of the world. The other side is the Valle Azul Hospital worked by Alonso Montero (Francisco Perez-Bannen), who falls in love with Magdalena Silva and later married to Laura Mardones, but their marriage ended in divorce. The City Hall is led by Raul, who is mayor of Valle Azul, helping the citizens to rebuild the town after the earthquake and the volcanic, which struck in the beginning. The family hotel is the home of Dioniso Silva (Mauricio Pesutic), who abused his lovely daughter, Dolores and turned his family to a disaster.

Cast 
 Álvaro Rudolphy as Joaquin Arellano, leader of the Youth Community near Valle Azul, killed by Alonso
 Luciana Echeverría as Magdalena Silva
 Francisco Pérez-Bannen as Alonso Montero, a doctor of the Valle Azul Hospital, fell in love with Magdalena
 Paola Volpato as Lola Briceno, Joaquin's first wife
 Alejandra Fosalba as Julia Ossa, Joaquin's partner and second wife
 Antonia Santa María as Carolina Ortega, Joaquin's third wife, later relationship with Dante 
 Matías Oviedo as Sebastian Pérez, one of Joaquin's helper, later married with Dolores 
 María José Illanes as Dolores Silva, Magdalena's older sister
 Mauricio Pesutic as Dionisio Silva, Magdalena and Dolores's devilish and abusive father, later committed suicide
 Marcela Medel as Milagros Lucero, Dolores's mother, Dante's grandmother and Dionisio's estranged wife
 Bastián Bondenhofer as Raul Sanfuentes, The mayor of Valle Azul and Dolores's first husband, later died of unknown causes
 Maricarmen Arrigorriaga as Sonia Arce, Eduardo's estranged wife and Laura's mother
 Óscar Hernández as Eduardo Mardones, Laura's father and Raul's partner, later fell into his death
 Adela Secall as Laura Mardones, Alonso's ex-wife, later ambushed by Dolores 
 Sebastián Layseca as Tomas Alamparte, one of Joaquin's helper, later died from drug overdose
 Juanita Ringeling as Ofelia Sanfuentes, Raul's daughter, fainted and dies
 Nicolás Oyarzún as Dante Silva, Dolores's son and Dionisio's grandson / son, killed by Laura

References

External links 
 

2011 telenovelas
2011 Chilean television series debuts
2012 Chilean television series endings
Chilean telenovelas
Spanish-language telenovelas
Televisión Nacional de Chile telenovelas